Regina Sackl (born 22 August 1959) is an Austrian former alpine skier who won slalom World cup in 1979 Alpine Ski World Cup.

Career
During her career she has achieved 6 results among the top 3 (3 victories) in the World Cup. She competed in the 1976 Winter Olympics and 1980 Winter Olympics.

World Cup results
Top 10

References

External links
 
 

1959 births
Living people
Austrian female alpine skiers
Olympic alpine skiers of Austria
Alpine skiers at the 1976 Winter Olympics
Alpine skiers at the 1980 Winter Olympics
FIS Alpine Ski World Cup champions